Erhard Bauer (30 May 1925 – 13 January 1994) was a German footballer.

References

1925 births
1994 deaths
German footballers
East German footballers
East Germany international footballers
FSV Zwickau players
FC Erzgebirge Aue players
Association football defenders